Lynwood Crumpler Drake III (October 10, 1949 – November 8, 1992) was an American spree killer who killed six people and wounded one other at two homes in Morro Bay and a card-playing club in Paso Robles, California, United States on November 7, 1992. He then drove to another house in San Miguel, where he took the owner hostage, before committing suicide the next morning.

Life
Drake, who was known as "Crazy Jim" by locals, was said to have often related to others that someday he would kill his enemies and himself. The last time he did so was one day before the shootings, but as he was regarded a "nut" nobody took his threats seriously. According to investigators and acquaintances Drake was a man who felt wronged by almost everyone he met.

Drake had worked as a bartender, caterer and construction worker, but had also attended acting classes in New York, and had a minor role in the film The World According to Garp, though at the time of the shooting he was unemployed and lived off of disability and his girlfriend's welfare.

In June 1991 he was arrested for assaulting a day-care worker after his daughter had suffered a cut in a fall. He was sentenced to one year's probation and ordered to complete a mental health program for aggressive people, though there is no indication that he ever did so.

In May 1992 Drake was evicted from his rental home by his landlord, Andrew Zatko, for not paying his rent for several months, whereupon his common-law wife left him, together with their infant daughter.

In a suicide note later found in his pocket Drake identified himself as Jesse Cole Younger, apparently in allusion to the outlaw and member of the Jesse James gang Cole Younger, and blamed those, who had become his first victims, for the estrangement from his girlfriend and daughter, writing "I Jesse Cole Younger killed 3 men because they took my wife, family and daughter from me." Furthermore, he harshly criticized his parents and sister, holding them responsible for his troubles and stated that "I have been persecuted my whole life by people." Drake ended his note with the words: "They refused to help. Damn the American family to hell. God forgive me."

Shooting spree
The shooting started shortly before 6 p.m. at a house in Morro Bay, California where Drake killed 80-year-old Andrew Zatko in the presence of his live-in companion Gladys Walton, by shooting him in the throat at close range with a revolver. Drake afterwards went to the home of another of Zatko's former tenants, 37-year-old Norman Metcalfe, who had testified against him at the court proceeding for his eviction and had further helped Zatko by removing Drake from his property. At 6:24 p.m., when Metcalfe came home accompanied by two other men, Drake killed him with a shot between the eyes. He also killed 32-year-old Danny Cizek and wounded Jeffrey Sidlin, 27, in the arm, during a struggle over his gun.

About five hours later, Drake, having armed himself with a 12-gauge shotgun, drove to Oak's Card Parlor in Paso Robles where he had lost several hundred dollars and had been barred for troublemaking and cheating. He killed dealers David Law, 47, and Joe Garcia, 60, and also fatally wounded a customer, 31-year-old Kris Staub, while sparing others who begged for their lives. Finally he made his way to the home of 60-year-old Joanne Morrow – also a former landlord of his – in San Miguel, and, beating her with a blackjack and threatening to kill her, he took her hostage. At approximately 5 a.m. on November 8, the house being surrounded by police, Drake committed suicide by shooting himself in the head with his .32-caliber six-shot revolver.

According to police, Drake had planned to kill two other people that day, his pastor and the day-care worker, an intent that was hampered by problems with his car.

Victims
 Danny Cizek, 32
 Joe Garcia, 60
 David Law, 47
 Norman Metcalfe, 37
 Kris Staub, 30
 Andrew Zatko, 80

See also
 List of homicides in California
 List of rampage killers in the United States

References

External links
Gunman Kills 6, Himself in Rampage , Los Angeles Times (November 9, 1992)
Killer of 6 Threatened Violence but Wasn't Believed, Police Say, Los Angeles Times (November 10, 1992)
Man Who Gunned Down 6 Had Troubled Background , Los Angeles Times (November 11, 1992)
A Story That Has No Moral , Los Angeles Times (November 15, 1992)
GUNMAN LEAVES 6 DEAD BEFORE TAKING OWN LIFE WELL-PLANNED SPREE CUTS SWATH IN 3 TOWNS, San Jose Mercury News (November 9, 1992)
Drake the Flake
Mother charged in death of 3-year-old daughter / Relatives say father's '92 slaying traumatized her, San Francisco Chronicle (April 11, 2002)

1949 births
1992 suicides
Actors from Norfolk, Virginia
American spree killers
American mass murderers
Suicides by firearm in California
Murder–suicides in California
1992 in California
Mass murder in 1992
Mass shootings in the United States
1992 murders in the United States
Deaths by firearm in California
Crimes in California
Attacks in the United States in 1992